Mathieu Turgeon (born August 2, 1979) is a Canadian trampoline gymnast, born in Pointe-Claire, Quebec.

Turgeon won a bronze medal at the 2000 Summer Olympics in individual trampoline and qualified for the 2004 Summer Olympics but failed to make the final. He is noted for performing very difficult routines.

Turgeon retired from competition in 2007 to pursue a career as a chiropractor, though he still performs in trampoline demonstrations. On December 22, 2007, he married his fellow-Olympian and former training partner Karen Cockburn.

References

1979 births
Canadian male trampolinists
Gymnasts at the 2000 Summer Olympics
Gymnasts at the 2004 Summer Olympics
French Quebecers
Living people
Olympic bronze medalists for Canada
Olympic gymnasts of Canada
People from Pointe-Claire
Sportspeople from Quebec
Olympic medalists in gymnastics
Medalists at the 2000 Summer Olympics
20th-century Canadian people
21st-century Canadian people